This is a list of governors for Skåne County in Sweden. The county was recreated in 1997 by a merger of Malmöhus County and Kristianstad County. For the period 1719–1996 see List of governors of Malmöhus County and List of governors of Kristianstad County.
Bengt Holgersson (1997–2005)
Göran Tunhammar (2006–2012)
Margareta Pålsson (2012–2016)
Anneli Hulthén (2016–present)

List of county governors of Helsingborg County, Landskrona County, and Malmöhus County

Before 1719, Scania was divided into counties with different borders from those in effect for Kristianstad County and Malmöhus County between 1719 and 1996. During 1658–1719, and again 1801–1809, the province was included in the Scanian Dominion (Skånska Generalguvernementet in Swedish). For the Governors-General during these periods, see List of Governors-General of Scania. During the period 1670–1675, the Scanian Dominion was suspended and three County Governors administered the counties in the area, answering directly to the Swedish king: one governor for Malmöhus County, one for Kristianstad County (which included Blekinge), and one for Halland County. During the rest of the period, the county governors in Scania answered to the Governor-General and different county divisions were in place. 
 1661–1666 Peder Pedersson Hammarskjöld (1614–1671) (Governor of Helsingborg County, Landskrona County, and a part of Malmöhus County under Governors-General Gustaf Otto Stenbock and Gustaf Persson Banér)  
 1666–1669 Augustin Leijonsköld (1632–1682) (Governor of Malmöhus County under Governor-General Gustaf Persson Banér)
 1669–1670 Claes Danckwardt-Lillieström (1613–1681) (Governor of Malmöhus County, Landskrona County and Helsingborg County) 
 1670–1677 Augustin Leijonsköld (1632–1682) (Governor of Malmöhus County, from 1676 under Governor-General Fabian von Fersen)

See also
 List of Governors-General of Skåne

Footnotes

References

 
Skane
1997 establishments in Sweden